William Lashner (born 1956), is an American novelist who formerly worked as a trial lawyer. He is a graduate of NYU School of Law and the Iowa Writers' Workshop at the University of Iowa. He has served as trial attorney in the Criminal Division of the United States Justice Department. He lives with his family outside of Philadelphia, Pennsylvania.

His novels include, Hostile Witness (1995); Bitter Truth (1997) aka Veritas; Fatal Flaw (2003); Past Due (2004); Falls the Shadow (2005); Marked Man (2007); Kockroach (as "Tyler Knox", 2007); A Killer's Kiss (2008); and Blood and Bone (2009).

References

External links
Official website

1956 births
American lawyers
20th-century American novelists
21st-century American novelists
American male novelists
University of Iowa alumni
Iowa Writers' Workshop alumni
Living people
Place of birth missing (living people)
New York University School of Law alumni
20th-century American male writers
21st-century American male writers